Enrico Bisso (22 January 1956 – 22 March 2016) was an Italian swimmer. He competed in two events at the 1976 Summer Olympics.

References

1956 births
2016 deaths
Italian male swimmers
Olympic swimmers of Italy
Swimmers at the 1976 Summer Olympics
Sportspeople from Genoa